"Carnival" is a song written and produced by singer-songwriter Natalie Merchant and was the lead single from her debut solo album, Tigerlily (1995). In the lyrics, the protagonist describes a street scene as a carnival. Merchant was inspired to write the song after visiting New York City for the first time when she was 16, claiming she was fascinated with the residents' unusual lifestyles, as she grew up in rural areas.

The single was released in the United States in July 1995 and reached number 10 on the Billboard Hot 100, becoming Merchant's highest-charting solo single in the US. It is also her most successful hit in Australia, peaking at number 24 on the ARIA Singles Chart, and reached number 17 in Canada. The single received a radio edit cutting the song down from the six-minute LP version. The video for the song, directed by Melodie McDaniel, shows scenes of Merchant walking the streets of New York City taking street photographs with a Leica M3.

Track listings
US CD single
 "Carnival" – 5:59
 "I May Know the Word" – 8:01

US cassette single
A. "Carnival" (album version) – 5:59
B. "I May Know the Word" (album version) – 8:07

European and Australian CD single
 "Carnival" (edit) – 4:02
 "Carnival" (LP version) – 5:59
 "I May Know the Word" – 8:07

Personnel
 Jennifer Turner – acoustic guitar, electric guitar, background vocals
 John Holbrook – organ, electric guitar, engineer
 Katell Keineg – background vocals
 Barrie Maguire – bass, 12-string guitar
 Natalie Merchant – vocals, piano, organ, vibraphone
 Peter Yanowitz – percussion, drums
 Mike Spenser – bass, electric guitar
 Eric Henderson – electric guitar

Charts

Weekly charts

Year-end charts

References

1995 debut singles
1995 songs
Elektra Records singles
Natalie Merchant songs
Songs written by Natalie Merchant
Warner Records singles